Viking is a Canadian comedy film, directed by Stéphane Lafleur and released in 2022. The film centres on a group of people who are working as a "B team" to reenact the events of the first crewed mission to Mars, in the hopes of trying to solve the interpersonal problems among the astronauts that have impacted the real mission.

The film's cast includes Steve Laplante, Larissa Corriveau, Fabiola N. Aladin, Hamza Haq, Denis Houle, Marie Brassard and Martin-David Peters.

The film premiered in the Platform Prize program at the 2022 Toronto International Film Festival on September 12, 2022.

Cast 

 Marie Brassard as Christiane Comte
 Steve Laplante as David
 Fabiola N. Aladin as Janet
 Denis Houle as Liz
 Larissa Corriveau as Steven
 Hamza Haq as Gary
 Christopher Heyerdahl as Roy Walker

Critical response
Pat Mullen of That Shelf called Viking "Lafleur's best film yet", and analyzed it in part as an allegory for the technological mediations that society has had to cope with through the COVID-19 pandemic.

The film was named to TIFF's annual year-end Canada's Top Ten list for 2022.

Awards

References

External links

2022 films
2022 comedy films
2022 science fiction films
Canadian science fiction comedy films
Films directed by Stéphane Lafleur
2020s Canadian films